The Lovejoy Bridge is a historic covered bridge in South Andover, Maine. Built in 1868, it is one of a small number of 19th-century covered bridges remaining in the state, and it is the state's shortest covered bridge. It was listed on the National Register of Historic Places in 1970.

Description
The Ellis River cuts a meandering course through the town of Andover, joining the Androscoggin River at Rumford Point. There has probably been a bridge at this site in southern Andover since the early 19th century, as the river course narrows sufficiently, and provides a crossing point for people traveling between Rumford Point and the main village of Andover, which is located further north. This bridge was built in 1868, but it is known that a small village already existed nearby, suggesting the existence of a previous bridge.

It rests on abutments built out of large granite blocks. Its sides are sheathed in vertical boards, and the gable ends have been trimmed. The bridge was reinforced in 1984 to support local traffic.

See also
National Register of Historic Places listings in Oxford County, Maine
List of bridges documented by the Historic American Engineering Record in Maine
List of bridges on the National Register of Historic Places in Maine
List of Maine covered bridges

References

External links

Covered bridges on the National Register of Historic Places in Maine
Bridges completed in 1868
Bridges in Oxford County, Maine
Historic American Engineering Record in Maine
National Register of Historic Places in Oxford County, Maine
Road bridges on the National Register of Historic Places in Maine
Wooden bridges in Maine
Long truss bridges in the United States